The Good, The Bad And The Ugly is an album by the Huntingtons released in 1999 on Tooth & Nail Records.

Track listing 
All songs written by Huntingtons, except track 4 (The Queers) and track 13 (Ramones).

 Pencil Neck
 I Don't Wanna Sit Around With You
 Dies Saugt
 Wimpy Drives Through Harlem
 We Don't Care
 FFT
 Aloha, It's You
 Don't Beat Me Up
 Goddess And The Geek
 JW
 Alison's The Bomb
 She's A Brat
 I Don't Want You
 I'm No Good
 All She Knows
 Bubblegum Girl
 Veronica
 She's Alright
 Jeannie Hates The Ramones
 Drexel U
 Crackhead
 Rock 'N' Roll Girl

Personnel
Mikey Huntington – Vocals/Bass
Cliffy Huntington – Guitar/Vocals
Mikee Huntington – Drums
A. J. Huntington – Guitar/Vocals

References

The Huntingtons albums
1999 live albums
Tooth & Nail Records live albums